Col. Alan Colstoun Gardner (19 November 1842 – 25 December 1907) was a British Liberal Party politician and soldier. He was a son of Alan Legge Gardner.

Military career
Capt Alan Gardner passed Staff College in 1872. He served in the 11th Hussars and the 14th King's Hussars. He was involved in the Anglo-Zulu War of 1879, and was present at the Battle of Isandlwana where he was one of only 5 British officers to survive. At the Battle of Hlobane Mountain his horse was killed. And at the Battle of Kambula he was severely wounded. He was mentioned in despatches twice and received the medal with clasp for services during the Anglo-Zulu Wars. He was a Brevet-Major.

He was Aide-de-camp to the Viceroy of Ireland Earl Cowper in 1880. He was also involved in the 1st Boer War in 1881.

In 1885, Gardner married Hon. Nora Beatrice Blyth. They had two sons and three daughters.

Political career
In politics he was a member of the Liberal Party. Gardner contested the Conservative seat of Marylebone East in 1895, coming second. He was appointed Deputy Lieutenant for Essex.

He served as a Justice of the Peace in Gloucestershire. He gained the Ross Division of Herefordshire from the Liberal Unionists at the General Election of January 1906, sitting until his death in 1907.

Death
He became ill during the winter of 1907 and took a holiday in Gibraltar in order to recuperate, but finally succumbed to Pneumonia on Christmas Day whilst in Algeciras.

Sources
British parliamentary election results 1885–1918, Craig, F. W. S.

References

External links 

1842 births
1907 deaths
Liberal Party (UK) MPs for English constituencies
UK MPs 1906–1910
British military personnel of the First Boer War